Georges Dorèze Morin (2 December 1884 – 24 December 1929) was a Liberal party member of the House of Commons of Canada. He was born in Saint-Hyacinthe, Quebec and became a notary.

He was first elected to Parliament at the Bagot riding in a by-election on 7 December 1925. Morin was re-elected there in 1926.

Morin died unexpectedly on 24 December 1929 at Saint-Pie-de-Bagot, Quebec, before the end of his term in the 16th Canadian Parliament.

  
|Liberal
|Georges Dorèze Morin
|align="right"|3,724 
  
|Conservative
|Guillaume-André Fauteux
|align="right"|3,225

References

External links
 

1884 births
1929 deaths
Liberal Party of Canada MPs
Members of the House of Commons of Canada from Quebec
People from Saint-Hyacinthe